Abbas Tyrewala (born 15 May 1974) is an Indian film screenwriter, lyricist and director. After making his mark as a screenwriter and dialogue writer in the early 2000s, with award-winning films like Maqbool (2003), Munnabhai M.B.B.S. (2003), he made his debut as a director in 2008 with a romantic comedy Jaane Tu Ya Jaane Na which turned out to be a critical and commercial hit and also featured an acclaimed soundtrack by A. R. Rahman.

Biography
Born and brought up in Mumbai, Abbas joined St. Xavier's College, Mumbai, for graduation, where he started working on plays and soon started writing advertising jingles, but he left without securing a degree to join Ogilvy & Mather PR agency, where he worked for a year; he then joined television production company Cinevista as a creative consultant, which he left in 2000, to become a full-time writer. He entered the film industry as a lyricist, writing for films like, Dil Pe Mat Le Yaar!! (2000), and Love Ke Liye Kuch Bhi Karega (2001), till he got his break with Santosh Sivan's Asoka (2001) as a dialogue writer. He is married to Pakhi who had her debut in his film Jhoota Hi Sahi opposite John Abraham.
Abbas hails from a modest background. Born to a poor Muslim family. Abbas's father owned a tire repair shop, his mom, Biwi, was keen to get Tyrewala a good education in order to help him achieve.

Filmography

Director
 Jaane Tu... Ya Jaane Na (2008)
 Jhootha Hi Sahi (2010)

Writer
 Asoka (2001)
 Chupke Se (2003)
 Darna Mana Hai (2003)
 Maqbool (2003)
 Main Hoon Na (2004)
 Vaada (2005)
 Salaam Namaste (2005)
 De Taali (2008)
 Jaane Tu... Ya Jaane Na (2008)

Dialogues and lyrics
 Dil Pe Mat Le Yaar!! (2000) (Lyrics)
 Kushi (2001) (Lyrics) (Telugu Film)
 Asoka (2001) (Dialogue)
 Leela (2002) (lyrics)
 Chupke Se (2003) (Writer)
 Maqbool (2003) (Screenplay & actor)
 Darna Mana Hai (2003) (Writer, screenplay & dialogue)
 Munnabhai M.B.B.S. (2003) (Dialogue)
 Paanch (2003) (Lyrics)
 Main Hoon Na (2004) (Dialogue & screenplay)
 Shikhar (2005) (Screenplay)
 Salaam Namaste (2005) (Story & dialogue)
 De Taali (2008) (Written by)
 Jaane Tu... Ya Jaane Na (2008) (Director & screenwriter)
 Jhoota Hi Sahi (2010) (Director, Screenplay & lyrics)
 Bang Bang! (2014) (Dialogue)
 2.0 (2018) (Dialogues & Lyrics in Hindi)
 War (2019) (Dialogue)
 Pathaan (2023) (Dialogue)

Awards
 2004: Filmfare Best Dialogue Award: Munnabhai M.B.B.S.
 2004: Zee Cine Award for Best Dialogue: Munnabhai M.B.B.S.
 2005: GIFA Best Screenplay Award: Maqbool
 2005: Zee Cine Award for Best Screenplay: Maqbool (with Vishal Bhardwaj)

References

External links
 
 
 Abbas Tyrewala: a one-man show at Rediff.com

Living people
Screenwriters from Mumbai
St. Xavier's College, Mumbai alumni
Indian male screenwriters
Hindi-language film directors
Filmfare Awards winners
Indian Muslims
Khoja Ismailism
21st-century Indian dramatists and playwrights
1974 births
Telugu screenwriters
Hindi screenwriters
21st-century Indian male writers
21st-century Indian screenwriters